Wijngaard is a surname. Notable people with the surname include:
 Frits Wijngaard (1926–2012), Dutch boxer
 Henk Wijngaard (born 1946), Dutch country singer
  (born 1944) Dutch mathematician, university teacher, and economist